The 2021–22 Mexican Pacific League season was the 76th season in the history of the Mexican Pacific League. There were 10 teams that competed. The season started on 5 October 2021 with a game between the defending champions Tomateros de Culiacán and Venados de Mazatlán. The season ended on 22 January 2022 with the last game of the Serie Final, where Charros de Jalisco defeated Tomateros de Culiacán to win the championship.

The champion earned the right to represent Mexico in the 2022 Caribbean Series in Santo Domingo, Dominican Republic.

Due to the COVID-19 pandemic, stadiums in Sonora (home to the Mayos, Naranjeros and Yaquis) only allowed attendance up to 60 percent of the stadiums' capacity; whereas the government of Sinaloa (home to the Algodoneros, Cañeros, Tomateros and Venados) allowed 30 to 50 percent of attendance in the stadiums.

Standings

Postseason

League leaders

Awards

References

2021 in baseball
2021 in Mexican sports